"First in Line" is a song by Elvis Presley from his second album Elvis (1956, Presley's first album on RCA).

Writing 
The song was written by Aaron Schroeder and Ben Weisman.

It was the first song Ben Weisman ever wrote for Elvis Presley.

Recording 
Presley recorded the song at the Radio Recorders Studio in Hollywood, California. on September 3, 1956.

Release 
The song was first released on Elvis Presley's 1956 album Elvis in 1956.

Musical style and lyrics 
It is a sad, plaintive ballad.

The New Rolling Stone Album Guide describes it as a "poignant love song", "one of Elvis' most deeply felt balladeering performances (despite doing 27 takes of the song before he was satisfied)." The book also notes the vulnerability of Presley's voice in it.

Track listing 
7-inch EP Strictly Elvis (Elvis, Vol 3.)  (RCA Victor EP-994)

Side 1
 "Long Tall Sally"
 "First in Line"

Side 2
 "How Do You Think I Feel"
 "How's the World Treating You"

References 

1956 songs
Elvis Presley songs
Songs written by Aaron Schroeder
Songs with music by Ben Weisman